The La Puente Community Ditch, through La Puente, New Mexico, is a  long irrigation ditch which was listed on the National Register of Historic Places in 1986.

It distributes water from the 1862-built Parkview Ditch, serving garden plots and 16 field plots.

References

Irrigation canals		
National Register of Historic Places in Rio Arriba County, New Mexico